Barron Gorge refers to the gorge created by the Barron River in the Cairns Region, Queensland, Australia.

The following articles relate to Barron Gorge:

 Barron Gorge, Queensland, the locality in which the gorge is located
 Barron Gorge National Park, a protected area centred on the gorge
 Barron Gorge Hydroelectric Power Station, a power station in the gorge